Sigma Sigma Sigma sorority has 111 active chapters.  Active chapters noted in bold, inactive chapters noted in italics. Chapters listed in order of founding.

Date conventions 
A single year or date shown means this is the year that chapter was founded. Where two dates are shown, hyphenated, for example "–", this indicates the active dates of a chapter that has been subsequently closed.  Where three dates are shown, for example "–, ", this means the chapter was active between 1915 and 1919, closed, but was then re-chartered in 1928 with a continuing active presence today. In the case of four dates, "–, –", the chapter began in 1957, closed in 1965, reopened in 1979 and closed again in 1987.

Chapters

References

External links
Sigma Sigma Sigma Collegiate Chapters

Sigma Sigma Sigma
chapters